Junko (Yanai) Mori (born 13 February 1948) is a Japanese composer and music educator.

Biography
Junko Mori was born in Niigata Prefecture, Japan, and attended the Tokyo National University of Fine Arts and Music, graduating with a Bachelor of Arts in music in 1971. She continued her studies in composition with Tomojiro Ikenouchi, Akio Yashiro, and Teizo Matsumura, and graduated with a Master of Music degree in composition in 1975 and a Master of Music in and musicology and solfeggio in 1978. After completing her studies, she worked as a music teacher and composer.

Selected works
Stage
Kyakyukyokekyongu torimono-chō (キャキュキョケキョングとりもの帖), Chamber Opera (1997)
Keraseki-kin dai-kansō (ケラ咳菌大感染), Chamber Opera in 2 acts (1997)
Kitakaze no wasureta hankachi (北風のわすれたハンカチ), Opera in 1 act, 2 scenes (1998)
Nijihige-kō to nanairo no tsuma (虹ひげ公と七色の妻), Opera in 1 act, 18 scenes (1998)
Kazura-sō no kidan (かずら荘綺譚 The Strange Tale of Kazura House), Mono-Opera (2001)
Tori ni sarawareta musume (鳥にさらわれた娘) (2003); libretto by Rubie Usagi (宇佐木るび枝) after the story by Naoko Awa (安房直子)
Akisu ni go-yōshin (空巣にご用心), Opera (2003); libretto by Rubie Usagi (宇佐木るび枝)
Mia wa izuko e (ミアはいずこへ), Opera (2003)
The Mystery of Kazura House (かずら荘の謎 Kazura-sō no nazo), Opera (2004)
Tabidachi no asa (旅立ちの朝), Chamber Opera in 1 act (2005)
A Dream Come True (夢が叶ったお話 Yume ga kanatta o-hanashi), Duo-Opera (2008)
Kashi no ki yashiki no nazo (樫の木屋敷の謎), Duo-Opera (2009)
Byōki ga naoru shinryōjo (病気が治る診療所), Chamber Opera in 1 act (2011)
Shōga-dōri wa ō-nigiwai (しょうが通りは大にぎわい), Chamber Opera in 1 act (2012)

Chamber music
String Quartet No. 3 (1975)
Autumn Mist for flute or shakuhachi and guitar (1984)
Imagery for piano (1987)
Nightfall, Concertino for flute and guitar (1985)
Twelve Children (12人のこども), Short Pieces for piano (1989)

Vocal
 Songs (テノールの為の歌曲) for tenor and piano (2007)

Mori's music has been recorded and issued on media, including:
Windows: Selected Piano Works by Contemporary Japanese Composers Label: Jasrac, ASIN: B000MP8IXE
Masayuki Koga/Douglas Hensley - Autumn Mist (1986) Cassette: Fortuna Records

References

1948 births
20th-century classical composers
20th-century Japanese educators
20th-century Japanese musicians
20th-century women composers
20th-century women educators
21st-century classical composers
21st-century Japanese educators
21st-century Japanese musicians
21st-century women composers
21st-century women educators
Japanese classical composers
Japanese women classical composers
Japanese music educators
Japanese opera composers
Living people
Women music educators
Women opera composers
21st-century Japanese women musicians